Bedřich Schejbal (born 1874, date of death unknown) was a Bohemian fencer. He won a bronze medal in the team sabre event at the 1908 Summer Olympics.

References

External links
 
 

1874 births
Year of death missing
Czech male fencers
Olympic fencers of Bohemia
Fencers at the 1908 Summer Olympics
Fencers at the 1912 Summer Olympics
Olympic bronze medalists for Bohemia
Olympic medalists in fencing
Medalists at the 1908 Summer Olympics
Sportspeople from the Austro-Hungarian Empire